Rahul Gunasekera (born 24 May 2001) is a Sri Lankan cricketer. He made his List A debut on 15 December 2019, for Nugegoda Sports and Welfare Club in the 2019–20 Invitation Limited Over Tournament. He made his first-class debut on 13 March 2020, for Nugegoda Sports and Welfare Club in Tier B of the 2019–20 Premier League Tournament.

References

External links
 

2001 births
Living people
Sri Lankan cricketers
Nugegoda Sports and Welfare Club cricketers 
Place of birth missing (living people)